Mervyn James Bibb FRS is an Emeritus Fellow at the John Innes Centre, Norwich, UK.

Education
Bibb was educated at the University of East Anglia where he graduated with a BSc in Biological Sciences and was awarded a PhD in 1978 for studies of plasmids in Streptomyces coelicolor.

Research
Bibb's research focused on

 The regulation of secondary metabolism (antibiotic production) in streptomycetes
 Functional genomics in Streptomyces, particularly transcriptome and proteome analysis
 Lantibiotics from actinomycetes

Awards and honours
Bibb was elected a Fellow of the Royal Society in 2013. His nomination reads:

References

Year of birth missing (living people)
Living people
Alumni of the University of East Anglia
Fellows of the Royal Society
Fellows of the American Academy of Microbiology